When the Earth Trembled (1913) is an American silent disaster film starring Ethel Clayton and Harry Myers. The film, a short feature, may be the first fiction film to depict the 1906 San Francisco earthquake.

Motion Picture Story Magazine (September 1913) published a story version of the screenplay by Henry Albert Phillips.

Plot
Paul Girard Sr. is horrified to learn that his son, Paul Jr. has fallen in love with Dora Sims, the daughter of his business partner. Upon learning that his son and Dora have married Paul cuts his son off and breaks his business dealings with Sims. Paul Jr. goes to work with his father-in-law, but unbeknownst to him his father buys shares in the company intending to ruin the company at an opportune moment.

Years later after learning that his father is about to sell the shares, Paul Jr. acquiesces to his wishes and temporarily departs from his wife and two children. Paul's boat is shipwrecked and he is presumed dead. A grief-stricken Paul Sr. puts off selling the shares. However, an earthquake hits the city killing Sims and destroying his business. Dora sets to work providing for her family but her daughter falls ill.

Coming across a picture of his grandchildren, Paul Sr. is moved and asks his friend Pearce to hunt down the children and tell their mother he is willing to take care of them. Hearing the offer Dora is appalled and refuses, only to relent when she realizes how sick her daughter is. The children are taken to their grandfathers where they are spoiled with all the toys and clothes they could want. Overwhelmed Paul Sr. asks Pearce to recommend a governess for him. Pearce advises Dora to disguise herself, which she does, and she goes to work as a governess for her children where she is very well received.

Meanwhile, Paul, who managed to survive the wreck of his ship, learns that no one has heard of his wife and children and they are presumed dead. Returning home he goes to see Pearce who brings him to his father. Seeing that her husband has returned Dora reveals her true identity and is welcomed into the family by Paul Sr. who has now had the opportunity to see what a wonderful mother she is.

Cast
Harry Myers as Paul Girard Jr.
Ethel Clayton as Dora Sims
Richard Morris as Richard
Mrs. George W. Walters as Coffee Mary
Bartley McCullum as Paul Girard Sr.
Mary Powers as Dora's Little Girl
Layton Meisle as Dora's Little Boy
Peter Lang as John Pearce

Production
Director O'Neil's insistence on being as realistic as possible nearly cost Clayton her life. The actress almost died in an accident in the earthquake scene, where a chandelier fell on her. 
Four months, a then-unprecedented length of time, were required to recreate the disaster. 
Lubin Studio reused some of its own 1906 newsreel footage of the quake aftermath. Most of the Lubin newsreel footage was destroyed in a later film vault fire.

Preservation status
This film was long thought to be a lost film, with no prints known to exist. In 2015, the film was restored by EYE Film Institute Netherlands from three incomplete prints from the EYE Film Institute, the British Film Institute, and the Museum of Modern Art. The restored print was premiered on 28 March 2015 at EyeMuseum.

On 29 May 2015, the San Francisco Silent Film Festival presented the film at the Castro Theatre in San Francisco.

References

External links

When the Earth Trembled at BFI Database
When the Earth Trembled at SilentEra
When the Earth Trembles at Presidio Officers Club
European lobby poster(court. EYE Filmmuseum, Desmet Collection)

1913 films
Silent American drama films
American silent feature films
American black-and-white films
Lubin Manufacturing Company films
Films about the 1906 San Francisco earthquake
Films set in San Francisco
1913 drama films
1910s rediscovered films
American disaster films
Rediscovered American films
Films directed by Barry O'Neil
1910s American films
1910s English-language films